Chocolate Starfish and the Hot Dog Flavored Water is the third studio album by American nu metal band Limp Bizkit, released on October 17, 2000, by Flip and Interscope Records.

Title 
The first part of the title is a slang term for the human anus. Hot Dog Flavored Water is an in joke started by Wes Borland at a truck stop while the band was on tour, where Borland saw bottles of Crystal Geyser flavored water, and made a joke about having meat or hot dog flavors.

Durst himself refers to the album name in three songs. First, "Livin' It Up", where he declares that "The chocolate starfish is my man Fred Durst" (Wes Borland has stated in an interview when questioned on the naming of the album that "Fred calls himself Chocolate Starfish, because people call him an asshole all the time"), "Hot Dog", where he tells his detractors to "Kiss my starfish, my chocolate starfish," and "Rollin' (Air Raid Vehicle)" where he mentions "Chocolate Starfish" in the introduction.

The longtime working title for the album had been "Limpdependence Day", but this was abandoned after the band failed to meet the deadline for their original intended release date of July 4.

Music and lyrics 
The song "Hot Dog" features the word "fuck" 46 times; Durst points out in the lyrics "if I say fuck 2 more times that's 46 fucks in this fucked up rhyme". The chorus references the Nine Inch Nails songs "Closer", "The Perfect Drug" and "Burn". Durst said he was a big fan of Nine Inch Nails, who inspired his music, although Nine Inch Nails frontman Trent Reznor had made negative remarks about Durst during that period. Reviewers have often interpreted Durst's lyrics in "Hot Dog" as an insult to Reznor. The lyrical references to Reznor's music led to him getting a co-writer credit, which Reznor said he approved as the record was going to print as not to hold up the release. "Livin' It Up" samples "Life in the Fast Lane" by the American rock band Eagles. The lyrics of "My Generation" reference "My Generation" by The Who and "Welcome to the Jungle" by Guns N' Roses.

Lawsuit and sample removal 
The track "Getcha Groove On" used an uncredited sample of music that is played during the Aerial Trapeze Act of Cirque Du Soleil's Cirque Reinvente. In the September 2008 issue of Kerrang, Wes Borland told the magazine: "We actually got sued over this piece of shit. There was some sort of sample used in it that someone didn't get full clearance for, so we ended up getting into some serious trouble for a little while." When the album was later released onto streaming services, the track "Getcha Groove On (Dirt Road Mix)", from their remix album New Old Songs, replaced the original version.

Commercial performance 
Chocolate Starfish and the Hot Dog Flavored Water debuted at number one on the Billboard 200, selling 1,054,511 copies in its first week of being released, with 400,000 of those copies being sold in the album's first day of release—the largest first-week sales debut for a rock album in the United States ever since Nielsen Soundscan began tracking album sales in 1991. It was also the fourth highest-week debut sales of 2000, behind Eminem's The Marshall Mathers LP, 'N Sync's No Strings Attached and Britney Spears' Oops!... I Did It Again. In its second week of being released, the album sold 392,000 copies, and remained at number 1 on the Billboard 200. The album also went to number 1 on the Canadian Albums Chart, selling 98,707 copies in its first week in the country. Two months after its release date, the album was certified 4× platinum by the Recording Industry Association of America (RIAA), and almost seven months after its release date, it was certified 5× platinum by the RIAA. In April 2002, the album was certified 6× platinum by the RIAA. It also was certified 6× platinum by Music Canada in October 2001.

Critical reception 

Chocolate Starfish and the Hot Dog Flavored Water received mixed reviews from critics, as Metacritic gave it a 49 out of 100. AllMusic writer Stephen Thomas Erlewine wrote, "Durst's self-pitying and the monotonous music give away that the band bashed Chocolate Starfish out very quickly – it's the sound of a band determined to deliver a sequel in a finite amount of time." The Rolling Stone Album Guide awarded the album pop three out of five stars, whereas the magazine itself gave the album a 3.5 out of 5. Readers of Kerrang! voted it as the worst album of 2000, with the band and Fred Durst also being voted the worst band of 2000 and "Arse of the Year", respectively.

Even so, Chocolate Starfish and the Hot Dog Flavored Water was listed in the book for 1001 Albums You Must Hear Before You Die, but later removed in recent editions of the book.

In 2020, it was named one of the 20 best metal albums of 2000 by Metal Hammer magazine.

Track listing 

Notes
 Trent Reznor receives music credits for "Hot Dog" for samples only.
 Eric Barrier and William Griffin receive music credits for "My Way" for samples only.
 Glenn Frey, Don Henley, and Joe Walsh receive music credits for "Livin' It Up" for samples only.
 Track 15 features voice overs by Ben Stiller, Mark Wahlberg, Rob Dyrdek and Stephan Jenkins.
 "Getcha Groove On" is replaced with the Dirt Road Mix version on streaming services.

Personnel 
Adapted from the album's liner notes.

 Limp Bizkit
 Fred Durst – vocals, art direction, liner notes, photography
 Wes Borland – guitars, cover art, vocals on "Snake in Your Face"
 DJ Lethal – turntables, samples
 John Otto – drums, vocals on "It's Like That Y'all"
 Sam Rivers – bass

 Additional musicians
 Scott Borland – keyboards on tracks 2, 4, 5, 7, 8, 11, 12 & 13
 Xzibit – vocals on "Getcha Groove On"
 Scott Weiland – vocals on "Hold On"
 DMX, Redman, Method Man – vocals on "Rollin' (Urban Assault Vehicle)"
 Rich Keller – bass guitar on "Rollin' (Urban Assault Vehicle)"
 Stephan Jenkins, Ben Stiller, Mark Wahlberg, Rob Dyrdek – spoken word on "Outro"
 Run-DMC – vocals on "It's Like That Y'all"

 Production
 Produced by Limp Bizkit and Terry Date, additional production by Scott Weiland and Josh Abraham (all tracks but 9 and 14); DJ Lethal and Fred Durst (track 9); Swizz Beatz (track 14)
 Executive producer – Eve Butler
 Assistant executive producer – Peter Katsis
 Production coordination – Erin Haley
 Editing: Domenic Barbers, DJ Premier, Carl Nappa
 Editing assistant – Cailan Mccarthy
 Engineers – Eric B., Joe Barresi, Barney Chase, Terry Date, Jesse Gorman, Kevin Guarnieri, Scott Olson, Ted Reiger, Dylan Vaughan, Darren Venbitti, Rakim
 Assistant engineers – Barney Chase, Steve Conover, David Dominguez, Jaime Duncan, Fran Flannery, Kevin Guarnieri, Femio Hernández, Matt Kingdom, Carl Nappa, Pete Novak, Ted Reiger, Doug Trantow, Alex Morfas
 Mastering – Vlado Mellior
 Mixing – Andy Wallace (all tracks but 9, 10 and 14), Rich Keller (track 14), Brendan O'Brien (track 10), Michael Patterson (track 9)
 Assistant mix engineers - Steve Sisco, Josh Wilbur, Ryan Williams, Karl Egsieker
 Art coordinator – Liam Wars

Charts

Weekly charts

Year-end charts

Decade-end charts

Certifications

References 

2000 albums
Limp Bizkit albums
Flip Records (1994) albums
Albums produced by Josh Abraham
Albums produced by Terry Date
Albums produced by Swizz Beatz
Albums recorded at Westlake Recording Studios